The Erez Crossing bombing was a suicide bombing which occurred on January 14, 2004, at the pedestrian/cargo terminal Erez Crossing located on the Israeli Gaza Strip barrier. Four Israelis were killed in the attack. 10 people, including four Palestinians, were injured in the attack.

Hamas and the Al Aqsa Martyrs Brigades claimed joint responsibility for the attack.

The attack
On Wednesday, 14 January 2004, around 9:30 am, a female Palestinian suicide bomber, approached the pedestrian/cargo terminal Erez Crossing (the main crossing point between Israel and the Gaza Strip where Israeli security forces tend to perform routine security checks to the Palestinian workers before they are allowed to enter Israel).

The suicide bomber was faking a limp and she told the security guards at the site that she had a metal plate in her leg which would most likely trigger the alarm. As a result, a female soldier was sent to check her. As the suicide bomber was waiting for the arrival of the female soldier, she managed to infiltrate into the inspection hall, and detonated the hidden explosive device which was concealed on her body.

Three soldiers and one civilian employee of the Erez crossing were killed in the attack. 10 people, including four Palestinians, were injured in the attack.

The perpetrators 
Hamas and the Al Aqsa Martyrs Brigades claimed joint responsibility for the attack. Hamas spokesman stated that the suicide bomber was a 22-year-old Palestinian mother of two named Reem al-Reyashi who originated from Gaza.

In addition, after the attack a video of the suicide bomber, which was filmed before the attack, was published in which al-Reyashi was wearing combat fatigues and holding an automatic rifle with a rocket-propelled grenade in the foreground. In the video al-Riyashi said that since age 13 she had dreamed of turning "my body into deadly shrapnel against the Zionists".

She continued: "I always wanted to be the first woman to carry out a martyrdom operation, where parts of my body can fly all over ... God has given me two children. I love them [with] a kind of love that only God knows, but my love to meet God is stronger still."

Hamas founder Sheikh Ahmed Yassin stated in an interview with the Reuters news agency that "The fact that a woman took part for the first time in a Hamas operation marks a significant evolution".

In The Israeli Honey Trap, an episode of the Netflix documentary series Terrorism Close Calls dealing with the attack, it was revealed that al-Reyashi had been targeted for death after it was revealed she had an affair with a senior Hamas commander, who was later eliminated in a targeted killing by Israel, as was Sheik Ahmed Yassin who gave approval for the attack.  Yassin gave approval for her to die a martyr to atone for her sin of adultery.  It is common in Islamic culture for women to be killed and men not held responsible for adulterous relationships.

See also 
 Reem Riyashi
 Female suicide bomber
 Wafa al Bass 2005 Erez crossing suicide bomber
 List of terrorist incidents, 2004

External links
 Female suicide bomber kills at least 4 Israelis - published on CNN on January 14, 2004
 Gaza attack kills four Israelis - published on BBC News on January 14, 2004
 Female suicide bomber kills four - published on The Age on January 15, 2004
 'I always wanted to be first woman martyr' - published on Independent Online on January 15, 2004
 Woman bomber kills four in Israel - published on The Daily Telegraph on January 14, 2004

References

Hamas suicide bombings
Mass murder in 2004
Terrorist incidents in Israel in 2004
January 2004 crimes
January 2004 events in Asia
Islamic terrorism in Israel